Erkan Petekkaya (born 11 December 1971) is a Turkish actor. He has starred in several television drama series including Beyaz Gelincik (White Poppies) (2005–07), Sessiz Fırtına (Silent Storm) (2007–08) Öyle Bir Geçer Zaman ki ("As Time Goes By") (2010–12), Dila Hanım (2012–14) and Paramparça (Broken Pieces) (2014–17).

In 2017 with the help of Fox TV, Petekkaya signed a contract with "Karga Seven Pictures", a production company affiliated with Red Arrow. He remained in Los Angeles in order to learn the culture of Hollywood.

Filmography

References

External links

Turkish male television actors
Turkish male film actors
1970 births
Living people
Golden Butterfly Award winners